Ludicra is an American heavy metal band from San Francisco. They originally formed in 1998 as a quartet and later expanded to five members. In 2011, the band announced on their official website that they had disbanded, but they reunited in 2022.

Ludicra's sound has been described as black metal and avant-garde metal. Influences include bands such as Darkthrone, Gorgoroth, Dødheimsgard and Bethlehem, and genres like thrash metal, doom metal, punk and folk.

The group included current and former members of other San Francisco-based bands such as Impaled, Hammers of Misfortune, Tallow, Missile Command, Ominum and punk band Hickey. They shared the stage with Impaled, Total Shutdown, the Fucking Champs and Krallice.

The band reunited in 2022, and performed at the Northwest Terror Fest in Seattle and at the Great American Music Hall in San Francisco.

Band members

Last lineup 
 John Cobbett – guitars (1998–2011)
 Christy Cather – guitars, vocals (1998–2011)
 Ross Sewage – bass (1999–2011)
 Laurie Sue Shanaman – vocals (1999–2011)
 Aesop Dekker – drums (1998–2011)

Former members 
 Jesika Christ – bass, vocals (1998–1999)

Session members 
 Melynda Jackson
 Lorraine Rath
 Kris Force
 Sigrid Sheie
 Jackie Perez-Gratz

Discography 
 Hollow Psalms (Life Is Abuse, 2002)
 Another Great Love Song (Alternative Tentacles, 2004)
 S/T EP (Life Is Abuse, 2006)
 Fex Urbis Lex Orbis (Alternative Tentacles, 2006)
 The Tenant (Profound Lore Records, 2010)

Other appearances 
Metal Swim – Adult Swim (compilation album; 2010)

References

External links 
 
 Official Facebook page
 Alternative Tentacle Records
 Life Is Abuse Records

Musical groups established in 1998
Musical groups disestablished in 2011
Black metal musical groups from California
Alternative Tentacles artists
Profound Lore Records artists